The Super Eight is the common name of an annual high school baseball tournament held in Brockton, Massachusetts that takes place in June each year. A selection committee chooses the top eight public and private high schools from the Massachusetts Interscholastic Athletic Association to compete in this tournament. The tournament is technically called the MIAA Division IA baseball tournament. The tournament is a double-elimination bracket of eight teams.

History 
Since 2014, the Super Eight has been held in Brockton, Massachusetts at Campanelli Stadium, home to the Brockton Rox. However, the first round of games are held at the higher seed's home field. The tournament is based after the older Super Eight Hockey Tournament to crown a supreme state champion. All games for the Super Eight Tournament are 9 innings, rather than the typical 7 innings for high school games.

Format history and changes 
 2014–present – 8 teams are selected to participate in a double-elimination tournament in Brockton, Massachusetts, during the month of June. Selections are made on the last Monday in May.
 2016 – Plymouth North High School was taken as the tournament's first non-Division 1 school. In addition, Pope Francis High School becomes the first team selected from Western Massachusetts.
 2017 – Belmont High School, the second Division 2 school, and Central Catholic High School both make their first appearances in the tournament.
 2018 – Selections were made on the first Sunday in June due to poor weather at the start of the season.

Division 1A champions by year

Team appearances

Most Super Eight wins

Most Super Eight Finals appearances

Most appearances without a Super Eight championship

Most Super Eight participants by one conference in a year

Championships by conference

See also 
 Massachusetts Interscholastic Athletic Association
 MIAA Division 1A Boy's Ice Hockey Tournament
 MIAA Division 1 baseball tournament
 MIAA Division 2 baseball tournament
 MIAA Division 3 baseball tournament
 MIAA Division 4 baseball tournament
 Baseball awards#U.S. high-school baseball

References 

Massachusetts Interscholastic Athletic Association
2014 establishments in Massachusetts
Recurring sporting events established in 2004